Jonathan Eddy Jensen (February 11, 1944 – June 18, 2022) was an American winemaker. He was known mostly for producing Californian pinot noir.

References

1944 births
2022 deaths
American winemakers